WGET (1320 AM) is a commercial radio station. Owned by Forever Media, it is licensed to Gettysburg, Pennsylvania.  WGET broadcasts an adult contemporary radio format, known as "Happy 93.7".

By day, WGET broadcasts at 1,000 watts.  But to avoid interference with other stations on 1320 AM at night, it reduces power to 500 watts.  Programming is also heard on FM translator W229DK at 93.7 FM.

History
The station made its debut broadcast on August 27, 1950. Robert Smith of New Oxford, Pennsylvania was the announcer who put WGET on the air. Twenty years later, on August 27, 1970, he and Lester M. Blair of Gettysburg, Pennsylvania, an engineer/announcer, were the only two people still working for WGET. The station signed on with power of 250 watts. As an aside, Walter Lane, photographer and amateur radio operator W3KGN in town had a transmitter that produced 275 watts. In March 1961, Judge W.C. Sheeley who had made the principal address at the opening ceremony, pressed a button in the press room of the Hotel Gettysburg which converted WGET from a 250-watt to a 1,000-watt AM station and a 10,000-watt FM station. At one time using a single tower, there are now has three AM towers and a 500-foot FM tower.

In January 1951, WGET affiliated with the short-lived Progressive Broadcasting System radio network. From the 1960s to the 1980s, WGET and later WGET-FM were affiliated with the Mutual Broadcasting System.

For much of the early 2000s, WGET had a full service, adult contemporary format.  In January 2011, the station flipped to a sports radio format as an affiliate of the Fox Sports Radio Network.  In June 2013, it switched affiliations to ESPN Radio.  

On May 21, 2019, WGET, along with sister station WHVR in York, Pennsylvania, began simulcasting an adult contemporary format with the launch of FM translator W229DK at 93.7 FM which rebroadcasts WGET.

On January 1, 2022, WGET and WHVR changed their formats to top 40 (CHR). With this change, they ended their simulcast and were branded as "Nu 93.7" and "Nu 95.3", respectively. The "Nu" branding was shared with WNUU (92.7) in nearby Starview.

On November 1, 2022, WGET and WHVR dropped their top 40 (CHR) format and began stunting with Christmas music, branded as "Santa 93.7", with a new format to launch in January 2023. On January 1, 2023, the stations returned to an adult contemporary format, and revived the "Happy" branding that had been used prior to January 2022. WNUU concurrently made identical format changes and became WPPY.

Previous logos

References

External links
WGET website

GET
Radio stations established in 1950
1950 establishments in Pennsylvania
Mainstream adult contemporary radio stations in the United States